This is a list of ambassadors from Turkey to the former state of Yugoslavia, which existed as a country between 1918 and 2003.

References 

Ambassadors of Turkey to Yugoslavia
Turkey
Yugoslavia